The following squads were named for the 1939 South American Championship that took place in Peru.

Chile
 Augusto Lobos
 Eduardo Simián
 Jorge Córdova
 Julio Córdova
 Ascanio Cortés
 Guillermo Riveros
 Humberto Roa
 Alfonso Domínguez
 Felipe Mediavilla
 Juan Montero
 Luis Ponce
 José Avendaño
 Voltaire Carvajal
 Roberto Luco
 Raúl Muñoz
 Gustavo Pizarro
 Enrique Sorrel
 Raúl Toro

Ecuador
 Marino Alcívar
 Manuel Arenas
 Luis Arias
 Fonfredes Bohórquez
 Ernesto Cevallos
 Leónidas Elizalde
 Augusto Freire
 Enrique Herrera
 Luis Hungria
 Jorge Laurido
 Aurelio Lavayen
 Francisco Martínez
 José Merino
 Jorge Naranjo
 José Peralta
 Eloy Ronquillo
 Augusto Solís
 Alfonso Suárez Rizzo
 Ramón Unamuno
 José Vasconez
 Humberto Vásquez
 Arturo Zambrano

Paraguay
 Ricardo Aquino
 Diego Ayala
 Eustaquio Bareiro
 Marcial Barrios
 Víctor Encina
 Fidelino Etcheverry
 Ferreria
 Tiberio Godoy
 Milciades Gomez Benitez
 Manuel González
 José Ibáñez
 Antonio Invernizzi
 Juan Félix Lezcano
 Eduardo Mingo
 Gabino Morin
 Raúl Núñez Velloso
 Miguel Ortega
 E. Romero
 Lorenzo Velloso
 Jacinto Villalba

Peru
 Jorge Alcalde
 Teodoro Alcalde
 Alberto Baldovino
 Víctor Bielich
 Segundo Castillo
 Raúl Chapel
 Arturo Fernández
 Teodoro Fernández
 Juan Honores
 Pedro Ibáñez
 Rafael León
 Feder Larios
 Adolfo Magallanes
 Arturo Paredes
 Jorge Parró
 Pablo Pasachie
 Enrique Perales
 Juan Quispe
 Pedro Reyes
 César Socarraz
 Carlos Tovar
 Juan Humberto Valdivieso

Uruguay
 Adelaido Camaití
 Aníbal Ciocca
 Oscar Chirimini
 Roberto Fager
 Eugenio Galvalisi
 Horacio Granero
 Pedro Lago
 Ernesto Mascheroni
 Aníbal Luis Paz
 Roberto Porta
 Abdón Reyes
 Plácido Rodríguez
 Manuel Sanguinetti
 Obdulio Jacinto Varela
 Severino Varela
 General Viana
 Félix Zaccour
 Erebo Zunion

References

Squads
Copa América squads